Bruce Lamb (25 August 1878 – 21 March 1932) was an English first-class cricketer. Lamb was a right-handed batsman.

Lamb made his first-class debut for Hampshire 1898 against the Yorkshire. That season Lamb made two further appearances for Hampshire, in matches against Cambridge University and Leicestershire.

Lamb would next appear for the county in 1901, which was to be Lamb's final first-class match which came against the touring South Africans.

Lamb died in Andover, Hampshire on 21 March 1932.

External links
Bruce Lamb at Cricinfo
Bruce Lamb at CricketArchive

1878 births
1932 deaths
People from Andover, Hampshire
Hampshire cricketers